Blue, White and Perfect is a 1942 American mystery film directed by Herbert I. Leeds and starring Lloyd Nolan, Mary Beth Hughes, and Helene Reynolds. It is part of Twentieth Century Fox's Michael Shayne film series.

The basis of the plot came from Blue, White, and Perfect, a six-part serialized story by Borden Chase that was published in Argosy magazine. The story was subsequently published as Diamonds of Death, a paperback novel.

The film sets were designed by the art directors Lewis Creber and Richard Day.

The film was released for home video as part of the Michael Shayne Mysteries Collection, Vol. 1, DVD set from 20th Century Fox.

Partial cast
 Lloyd Nolan as Michael Shayne  
 Mary Beth Hughes as Merle Garland  
 Helene Reynolds as Helen Shaw  
 George Reeves as Juan Arturo O'Hara  
 Steven Geray as Vanderhoefen  
 Henry Victor as Rudolf Hagerman  
 Curt Bois as Friedrich Gerber, alias Nappy Dubois  
 Marie Blake as Ethel  
 Emmett Vogan as Charlie  
 Mae Marsh as Mrs. Bertha Toby  
 Frank Orth as Mr. Toby  
 Ivan Lebedeff as Alexis Fournier  
 Wade Boteler as Judge  
 Charles Trowbridge as Capt. Brown  
 Edward Earle as First Officer Richards 
 Cliff Clark as Inspector Peterson  
 Arthur Loft as Joseph P. McCordy  
 Ann Doran as Miss Hoffman  
 Charles Williams as Theodore H. Sherman Jr.- Printer

References

External links
 

1942 films
1942 mystery films
American mystery films
Films directed by Herbert I. Leeds
20th Century Fox films
Films set in Hawaii
American black-and-white films
1940s English-language films
1940s American films